Micronaclia is a genus of moths in the subfamily Arctiinae. The genus was erected by George Hampson in 1898.

Species
 Micronaclia imaitsia Griveaud, 1964
 Micronaclia mimetica Griveaud, 1964
 Micronaclia rubrivittata Gaede
 Micronaclia simplex Butler

Formerly placed here
 Micronaclia eleonora Oberthür
 Micronaclia muscella
 Micronaclia severina Oberthür
 Micronaclia tenera

Status unclear
 Micronaclia purpusilla Mabille

References

Arctiinae